This list includes publishers (not manufacturers, contrary to title, see external links) of card games, board games, miniatures games, wargames, role-playing games, and collectible card games, and companies which sell accessories for use in those games. Not included in this list are companies that simply resell products of other companies, although many of the companies listed here do have online stores that sell their own products.

0–9
 1i Productions – board games
 3W – wargames and wargaming magazines

A
 Ad Astra Games – wargames
 Agents of Gaming – wargames
 Agglo – magnetic travel games
 Alea – part of Ravensburger
 Alderac Entertainment Group – collector card games, role-playing games
 Alternative Armies – wargames
 Amarillo Design Bureau Inc. – space war games and miniatures
 Amigo Spiele – board games
 APBA – sports, board, and computer games
 Apex Publications – role-playing games
 Arc Dream Publishing – role-playing games
 Archaia Studios Press – role-playing games
 Art Meets Matter – board games and game design concepts
 Asmodée Éditions – board games; formerly called Siroz
 Atlas Games – collectible card games, card games, and role-playing games
 Australian Design Group – wargames
 Avalanche Press – historical boardgames and historical d20 modules
 Avalon Hill – board games; part of Wizards of the Coast

B
 Baccus 6mm – miniatures
 Bandai – collector card games
 Bards and Sages – role-playing games
 Battleline Publications – wargames
 Bethesda Softworks – role-playing/freeroam games; Fallout series and Elder Scrolls series
 Biohazard Games – role-playing games
 Black Industries – role-playing accessories
 Blacksburg Tactical Research Center – role-playing games
 British Isles Traveller Support – role-playing accessories
 Buffalo Games – board games, jig saw puzzles

C
 Cactus Game Design – Bible-themed board and card games
 Cakebread & Walton – role-playing games
 Cartamundi – board games, playing cards and cards for games
 Catalyst Game Labs – wargames and role-playing games
 Chaosium – role-playing games
 Cheapass Games – cheaply produced board games and card games
 Clash of Arms – Art of War magazine and miniatures rules
 Clementoni - educational board games
 Columbia Games – historical and miniatures games, board games
 Conflict Games – wargames
 CoolMiniOrNot – miniatures games, board games, card games
 Cosmic Wimpout – dice games
 Crafty Games – role-playing games
 Cranium, Inc. – board games and card games
 Crown and Andrews – board games, educational games, wooden puzzles, Rubiks puzzles, and jigsaw puzzles
 Cubicle 7 Entertainment – role-playing and card games
 Czech Games Edition – board games

D
 Days of Wonder – board games
 Decipher, Inc. – trading card games, role-playing games
 Decision Games – board games
 Descartes Editeur – board games
 Destination Games – dice games
 Different Worlds – role-playing games and accessories
 Dragon – gaming magazine
 Dream Pod 9 – miniatures and role-playing games
 Dream Factory – VCR games
 Dwarfstar Games – wargames

E
 Eagle Games – board and card games
 Eden Studios, Inc. – card, role-playing, and computer games
 Eos Press – role-playing and card games
 Eurogames – board games
 Everest (game publisher and distributor) – board games, card games, toys
 Evil Hat Productions – role-playing games
 Exile Games Studio – role-playing games

F
 Fantasy Flight Games – board games, d20 System supplements and role-playing games
 Fantasy Games Unlimited – role-playing games and accessories
 Fantasy Productions – role-playing games
 FASA Corporation – role-playing games, tabletop war games (out of business; see WizKids and Fanpro)
 Fleer – collector card games accessories
 Flying Buffalo – board, role playing, and play-by-mail games
 Fretter's – board games
 FSpace Publications – role-playing games
 Forge World – resin miniature wargames

G
 The Game Crafter – card games, board games, game pieces, game accessories
 Game Designers' Workshop – wargames and role-playing games (out of business; see Far Future Enterprises)
 Game Research/Design – wargames
 The Gamers – wargames, board games
 Games Research Inc – board wargames
 Games Workshop – miniature games and board games
 Gibsons Games – board games
 GiftTRAP – board games
 Gigamic – board games
 GMT Games – board, card, and role-playing games
 Goodman Games – role-playing games
 Great White Games – collector card games and card games
 Green Knight Publishing – role-playing games
 Green Ronin Publishing – role-playing accessories
 Grenadier Miniatures – miniatures and board games
 Grimoire Games – role-playing games
 Guardians of Order – role-playing games
 Guidon Games – board games and wargames

H
 Habermaaß GmbH – board games
 Hans im Glück – board games
 Harebrained Schemes – miniatures, boardgames
 Hasbro – board and card games
 Hero Games – role-playing games and accessories
 Hidden City Games – collector card games
 Hobby Japan – wargames
 Holistic Design – role-playing and computer games
 Humanhead Studios – role-playing games and accessories
 Hyperion Entertainment – board games

I
 Imagination Games – board games and DVD games
 Iron Crown Enterprises – role-playing games
 Issaries, Inc. – role-playing games
 Italeri – miniatures

J
 J. W. Spear & Sons – board games
 Jaques of London – board games
 Jedko Games – wargames
 Jeux Descartes – role-playing games
 John Wallis – board games
 Judges Guild – role-playing accessories

K
 Kenzer & Company – miniatures and role-playing games
 Kosmos – board games
 Kobold Press – role-playing games

L
 Last Unicorn Games – role-playing games and miniatures
 Lego – building blocks
 Looney Labs – card and board games
 Late for the Sky Production Company – property trading board games

M
 Majora – board, card and other games (several educational), books, puzzles and toys (several educational)
 Margaret Weis Productions, Ltd – role-playing games
 Matrix Games – wargames
 Mattel – board and card games
 Mayfair Games – board and role-playing games
 McFarlane Toys – miniatures
 McLoughlin Brothers – board games
 Mego Corporation – board and card games, action-figure type toys; now defunct
 Melbourne House – wargames
 Merillian –  board games
 Metagaming Concepts – board and role-playing games
 Milton Bradley Company (Hasbro Company) – board games
 Mind Storm Labs – role-playing games
 Misfit Studios – role-playing games
 MJM Australia – board games
 Modiphius Entertainment – role-playing games, boardgames, miniature wargames and card games. 
 Mongoose Publishing – role-playing games and accessories, miniatures games
 Monte Cook – role-playing accessories
 Morning – board and card games
 Multi-Man Publishing – wargames

N
 Naipes Heraclio Fournier – card games
 National Entertainment Collectibles Association – action figures
 Necromancer Games – role-playing accessories
 Neogames – role-playing games
 Nightfall Games – role-playing games
 Nikoli – board games
 Nintendo – began as a card game manufacturer

O
 Operational Studies Group – wargames
 Osprey Publishing – role-playing accessories
 Out of the Box Publishing – board and card games
 Outset Media – board and card games

P
 Pacesetter Ltd – role-playing games and board games (defunct)
 Pagan Publishing – role-playing accessories
 Paizo Publishing – role-playing games and accessories
 Palladium Books – role-playing games
 Paradigm Concepts – role-playing accessories
 Pariah Press – role-playing games
 Parker Brothers – board games
 Partizan Press – role-playing games
 Patch Products – board and card games
 Pelgrane Press – role-playing games
 Phage Press – role-playing games
 Piatnik & Söhne – card games
 Pinnacle Entertainment Group – role-playing and collector card games
 Piquet – wargames
 Point Zero Games – card games
 Precedence Entertainment – collector card games
 Precis Intermedia – role-playing and miniatures games
 Pressman Toy Corp. -board games
 Price Stern Sloan – card games
 Privateer Press – miniatures and role-playing games

Q
 Q-workshop – game accessories
 Queen Games – board games

R
 R. Talsorian Games – role-playing games
 Ral Partha – miniatures, accessories, paints, miniature rules, and board games.
 Ravensburger
 Reaper Miniatures
 Reindeer Games – role-playing games
 Replay Publishing – sports board games
 Rio Grande Games – board games
 Ronin Arts – role-playing games
 RoseArt – board games
 Roxley – board games

S
 Sabertooth Games – collector card games
 Score – collector card games
 Selchow & Righter – family board games
 Set Enterprises – card games
 Simulations Publications, Inc. (SPI) – wargames and role-playing games
 Skirmisher Publishing – miniatures and role-playing accessories
 Sovereign Press, Inc – role-playing accessories
 Spica Publishing – role-playing game supplements
 Stein & Day – wargames
 Steve Jackson Games – board, card, and role-playing games
 Strat-O-Matic – board games
 Strategic Studies Group – collectible card games
 Sword & Sorcery Studios – role-playing games and accessories

T
 Takara – role-playing games
 Target Games – role-playing games
 Task Force Games – board games and wargames
 TDC Games – board games and jigsaw puzzles
 TerrorBull Games – satirical and educational board and card games
 Testor Corporation – miniatures accessories
 ThinkFun – educational games, brainteasers and card games (formerly; Binary Arts Corp.)
 THQ – role-playing games
 Tilsit Editions – board games
 Tomy – board and card games
 Toy Vault, Inc. – licensed board and card games
 Tri Tac Games – role-playing games miniatures micro games
 Troll Lord Games – role-playing accessories
 TSR, Inc. – role-playing and board games; part of Hasbro
 Tuff Stuff – collector card games
 Tuonela Productions Ltd – board games

U
 Überplay – board and card games
 Ungame – board and card games
 Upper Deck Entertainment – collectible card games
 United States Playing Card Company – cards

V
 Vajra Enterprises – role-playing games
 Victory Games – role-playing games

W
 Warlord Games – wargames, miniatures
 Waddingtons – board and card games
 Wargames Factory – hard plastic miniatures
 Wargames Foundry – miniatures
 Wargames Research Group – miniatures games
 West End Games – role-playing accessories
 White Wolf Publishing – role-playing games
 Wicked Dead Brewing Company – role-playing games
 Wizards of the Coast – collectible card games and role-playing games; now part of Hasbro
 WizKids – miniatures games and board games
 Woodland Scenics – miniatures accessories
 Wyrd Miniatures – miniatures and board games

Y
 Yaquinto Publications – wargames

Z
 Z-Man Games – board, card, and role-playing games

See also
Lists of video game companies
Outline of games

External links 
List of actual manufacturers (factories) that produce physical games

Game